The 1999–2000 Northern Football League season was the 102nd in the history of Northern Football League, a football competition in England.

Division One

Division One featured 17 clubs which competed in the division last season, along with three new clubs, promoted from Division Two:
 Durham City
 Peterlee Newtown
 Shotton Comrades

Also, Stockton changed name to Thornaby-On-Tees.

League table

Division Two

Division Two featured 16 clubs which competed in the division last season, along with three new clubs, relegated from Division One:
 Newcastle Blue Star
 Penrith
 Shildon

Also, Ryhope CA changed name to Kennek Ryhope CA, while Washington changed name to Washington Ikeda Hoover.

League table

References

External links
 Northern Football League official site

Northern Football League seasons
1999–2000 in English football leagues